Nicanor Alejandro Serrano Aguilar (13 January 1933 in Cuenca – 6 August 2019) was an Ecuadorian politician and sports leader.

Biography 

Serrano was Vice President of Ecuador from May 5, 2005 to January 15, 2007. The National Congress of Ecuador elected him to fill the vacancy of the Vice-presidency when Alfredo Palacio became President of Ecuador. Serrano was over the course of his career a mayor, councilman, sports leader and civil engineer. 

Serrano was educated at Escuela de los Hermanos Cristianos, then went on to junior and senior high school at the Colegio de los Padres Jesuitas. For the completion of secondary education, he entered the Faculty of Philosophy and Literature at the University of Cuenca, and then to the Faculty of Civil Engineering at the same university. He held two Ph.D. degrees one in Philosophy and Literature and the other in engineering and civil engineering. 

Serrano worked as a lecturer at several schools, namely in Coegio Rafael Borja, Colegio Benigno Malo, Garaicoa Colegio, Colegio Rosa de Jesús Cordero, Colegio Fray Vicente Solano (served as president), then served as dean of the Faculty of Philosophy and Literature at the University of Cuenca and also taught at the Faculty of Law, University del Azuay in society. Serrano served as a board member of Canton Cuenca and later as a member of the House of Representatives at the provincial level in the province of Azuay. Later he was elected governor of the Azuay Province and then twice served as provincial deputy in the National Parliament. Serrano also served as mayor of Cuenca. Serrano was married and had four children.

References 

Vice presidents of Ecuador
1933 births
2019 deaths
Mayors of places in Ecuador
Members of the National Congress (Ecuador)
People from Cuenca, Ecuador